Robert Evans was an English amateur footballer who made one appearance in the Football League for Woolwich Arsenal as a right back.

Personal life 
Evans served as a private in the British Army during the First World War.

Career statistics

References

English footballers
English Football League players
Year of birth missing
Year of death missing
Footballers from Greater London
Association football fullbacks
Arsenal F.C. players
Leyton Orient F.C. players
British Army personnel of World War I
British Army soldiers